Joseph Brittain (birth unknown – death unknown) was an English professional rugby league footballer who played in the 1910s and 1920s.

Playing career

International honours
Joe Brittain won caps for England while at Leeds in 1921 against Wales, Other Nationalities, and Australia, in 1922 against Wales.

Challenge Cup Final appearances
Joe Brittain played , and scored a try in Leeds' 28-3 victory over Hull F.C. in the 1922–23 Challenge Cup Final during the 1922-23 season at Belle Vue, Wakefield, the only occasion the Challenge Cup final has ever been staged at Belle Vue.

County Cup Final appearances
Joe Brittain played  in Leeds' 11-3 victory over Dewsbury in the 1921–22 Yorkshire County Cup Final during the 1921–22 season at Thrum Hall, Halifax on Saturday 26 November 1921.

Club career
Joe Brittain made his début for Leeds against Batley at Headingley Rugby Stadium, Leeds on Saturday 4 September 1915.

The Leeds backline in the early 1920s was known as the Busy Bs, as it included; Jim Bacon, Arthur Binks, Billy Bowen, Joe Brittain, and Harold Buck.

References

External links

England national rugby league team players
English rugby league players
Leeds Rhinos players
Place of birth missing
Place of death missing
Rugby league five-eighths
Rugby league halfbacks
Rugby league players from Yorkshire
Year of birth missing
Year of death missing
York Wasps players